Hash House may refer to:
Hash House a go go, a restaurant chain
Hash House Bikers, an international group of non-competitive bicycling, social clubs
Hash House Harriers, an international group of non-competitive running, social clubs
John T. Hash House, a historic home in Dayton, Oregon